Sky Is the Limit is the seventh studio album published by the Swiss DJ and producer DJ Antoine, released on 25 January 2013. The first single released from the album is "Bella Vita". The second was All I Live For and the third Sky Is the Limit.

Background 
DJ Antoine announced the first time on 22 November 2012 on his official YouTube channel announced that he will release on 25 January 2013 a new album. Not at all songs the guest musicians or singers are given. The Swiss singer Maury, who sang hits like All We Need, In My Dreams or Broadway, acted on this CD with many tracks, both as a singer and as a songwriter and producer with Mad Mark and Antoine.

Description of the CDs 
First CD (↓ Track listing)
The first CD consists entirely of new songs. Various, often not mentioned musicians, work with here. All tracks from DJ Antoine were mixed by his studio partner and good friend Mad Mark. Cover songs are also available, for example "Power to the People" by fii.

Second CD (↓ Track listing)
On CD number two are also contained many new songs, and here also the DJ duo Flame Makers participated alongside Mad Mark on many songs. As a special this CD includes a remix of the song "Ma Chérie", in which the American rapper Pitbull participates. You can also, the song "Beautiful Liar" in two variations,  as a dance and as a rock version.

Third CD (↓ Title List)
The third CD is only in the Limited Edition. It consists of a special DJ mix, which includes selected songs of this album, which merge into each other. But not the radio version are used, but the extended versions of the songs. In download stores such as Amazon or iTunes, it is available only as a 76-minute single-track.

Release 
Sky Is the Limit appeared almost worldwide. In each of the selected countries, it was published at various times on various record label. There have also different number of songs. In a country more and in another country less, for example, the Japanese version of Sky Is the Limit includes the song "Every Breath" from 2010. Also, various CD cover were selected.

Release dates

Editions 
There are different editions of the album available:

Chart performance 
Within just a few hours, the album was ranked number one in the German, Austrian and Swiss iTunes album chart. In Germany it rose in the first week til number No. 6 in the official album charts. In Austria, it jumped to number 2 and in Switzerland, the album reached number one on the album charts.

Although the song "House Party", "Sky Is the Limit" and "Perfect Day" did not appear as a single, it reached due to strong downloads in several music portals the singles charts in many countries. "Bella Vita" peaked on number one only one week after the album was released. In Germany "Sky Is the Limit" was the most successful song of the album.

Track listing

Charts

Weekly charts

Year-end charts

Certifications

References

External links 
 Official page of the album on kontor.tv
 
 

2013 albums
DJ Antoine albums